Porush-e Pain (also Romanized as Porūsh-e Pā’īn; also known as Porūsh) is a village in Otaqvar Rural District, Otaqvar District, Langarud County, Gilan Province, Iran. At the 2006 census, its population was 488, in 130 families.

References 

Populated places in Langarud County